Sea Tales is a 1967 Soviet adventure film directed by Aleksey Sakharov and Aleksandr Svetlov.

Plot 
The film consists of two short stories. In the first story the Russian sailor Nikolay and the former bullfighter Spaniard Jose Maria take a boat, the owner of which plans to flood him in order to get insurance. In the second short story, friends become sailors on the Jupiter ship and are given the task of delivering an underground newspaper to Odessa...

Cast 
 Nikolay Dostal as Jose-Maria Damec
 Viktor Zadubrovsky as Nikolay Chumachenko
 Vladimir Balashov as Leontiy Andreich
 Anatoliy Alekseev as Supervisor
 Vladimir Balon as Vladimir Yakovlevich
 Arseniy Barskiy as Inspector
 Eduard Bredun as Zuyev
 Yevgeny Morgunov as «Singer»

References

External links 
 

1967 films
1960s Russian-language films
Soviet adventure films
1967 adventure films